The GIDS Shahpar is an unmanned aerial vehicle (UAV) built by Global Industrial Defence Solutions of Pakistan and used by the Pakistani military. It is currently in production following the completion of a test and qualification phase.

Development 
According to an engineer of AERO (Advanced Engineering Research Organisation), one of the seven companies forming the  GIDS consortium, the only parts of the Shahpar aircraft system not produced in Pakistan are the engine and tyres. The sensor suite, a multi-sensor turret designated "Zumr-1 (EP)", is built at an AERO facility near Islamabad. The design features a pusher engine with canard foreplanes in front of the wings.

The Shahpar is designed to autonomously take off and land on a runway or land with a parachute. Payloads are available for reconnaissance and day/night surveillance. Targets on the ground can be geo-referenced and geo-pointed by the avionics. The military standard hardware is built to Environmental Standard 810F. Ground equipment is capable of mission planning and simulation; mission management and control as well as debriefing of ground crew.

Operational History 
The first fleet of Shahpars entered service with the Pakistan Air Force and Pakistan Army in 2013 along with the Burraq UCAV. Each flight is made up of five aircraft, a communications station and a ground control station.

Variants
Shahpar
Shahpar-2

Specifications

See also

References

Airborne military robots
Single-engined pusher aircraft
Pakistan Army
Pakistan Air Force
Science and technology in Pakistan
Unmanned military aircraft of Pakistan